The House at 3 Dean Street in Southbridge, Massachusetts is a rare well-preserved example of a worker housing cottage built by the locally important American Optical Company.  It is a small -story house, three bays wide, presenting its side to the street.  At the time of its listing on the National Register of Historic Places in 1989, it still had the original siding from its original construction, about 100 years earlier, which included cut shingles in the gable, and bracketed eaves.  These details have since been lost or obscured by the application of modern siding (see photo).

See also
National Register of Historic Places listings in Southbridge, Massachusetts
National Register of Historic Places listings in Worcester County, Massachusetts

References

External links
 3 Dean Street MACRIS Listing

Houses in Southbridge, Massachusetts
Queen Anne architecture in Massachusetts
Houses completed in 1878
National Register of Historic Places in Southbridge, Massachusetts
Houses on the National Register of Historic Places in Worcester County, Massachusetts